"Can't Stop Fallin' into Love" is a song by the American rock band Cheap Trick, which was released in 1990 as the lead single from their eleventh studio album Busted. It was written by guitarist Rick Nielsen, lead singer Robin Zander and bassist Tom Petersson, and produced by Richie Zito.

Following the band's commercial comeback with Lap of Luxury in 1988, "Can't Stop Fallin' into Love" and its parent album Busted attempted to capitalize on the previous album's success. The song reached No. 12 on the Billboard Hot 100, which was considered disappointing to Epic. It would be Cheap Trick's last single to reach the Top 40.

Background
"Can't Stop Fallin' into Love" was originally written as an instrumental track in early 1987. Once the band had added lyrics, the song was demoed in Milwaukee, with blues singer/songwriter Harvey Scales on vocals. Soon after, Zander presented a copy of the demo to Rod Stewart and although the singer expressed interest in recording the song for his upcoming album, Epic blocked the deal as they felt Cheap Trick should record and release their own version instead.

Music video
The song's music video was directed by Nigel Dick and produced by Lisa Hollinshead.

Release
"Can't Stop Fallin' into Love" was released by Epic on 7" vinyl, 12" vinyl and CD. The 12" vinyl and a limited edition CD single were released in the UK only, with a 12" vinyl also released for the Netherlands. For its release as a single, the song had a "Radio Mix" produced. The single's B-side, "You Drive, I'll Steer", was taken from Busted. The 12" vinyl released in the Netherlands featured the extra track "I Can't Understand It", also from Busted. On the 12" vinyl released in the UK, the "LP Version" of the song was used, along with "You Drive, I'll Steer" and the band's 1988 US chart-topper "The Flame". The UK CD single used the same track listing but the A-side was the "Radio Mix".

Critical reception
Upon release, Billboard commented: "Strumming guitar rocker should easily build upon the momentum started by group's career-resuscitating project last year." Pan-European magazine Music & Media wrote: "A grandiose ballad from the reformed rockers. Hook-heavy music full of ringing guitars and macho lyrics."

In a review of the single, AllMusic gave three out of five stars and wrote: ""Can't Stop Fallin' into Love" began life as an instrumental, but the worthless words make the piece shine. Zander pouts and preens in prime peacock fashion, quoting trashy Rod Stewart and grimy greats the Troggs. High on the platinum fumes of the glistening Lap of Luxury, the charismatic quartet seems happy and comfortable (temporarily) back on top. Slipping love letters and suicide notes under a "Stone Free" bassline and glossy adult contemporary sheen, this track is positively Cheap Trick at their subversive best."

Track listing
7" Single
"Can't Stop Fallin' into Love (Radio Mix)" - 3:49
"You Drive, I'll Steer" - 4:33

12" Single (UK release)
"Can't Stop Fallin' into Love (LP Version)" - 3:49
"The Flame" - 4:33
"You Drive, I'll Steer" - 4:33

12" Single (Dutch release)
"Can't Stop Fallin' into Love" - 3:49
"You Drive, I'll Steer" - 4:33
"I Can't Understand It" - 3:29

CD Single (UK Limited Edition release)
"Can't Stop Fallin' into Love (Radio Mix)" - 3:49
"The Flame" - 4:30
"You Drive, I'll Steer" - 4:33

Charts

Personnel
Cheap Trick
 Robin Zander - lead vocals, rhythm guitar
 Rick Nielsen - lead guitar, backing vocals
 Tom Petersson - bass, backing vocals
 Bun E. Carlos - drums, percussion

Additional personnel
 Richie Zito - Producer
 Mike Shipley - mixing on "Can't Stop Fallin' into Love"
 David Thoener - mixing on "You Drive, I'll Steer"
 George Marino - mastering

References

1990 songs
1990 singles
Cheap Trick songs
Songs written by Rick Nielsen
Songs written by Robin Zander
Songs written by Tom Petersson
Song recordings produced by Richie Zito
Epic Records singles